The Snatch Thief is a 2018 Argentine drama film directed by Agustin Toscano. It was screened in the Directors' Fortnight section at the 2018 Cannes Film Festival. In 2019, the film participated in the 20th Havana Film Festival New York where Sergio Prina was awarded the Havana Star Prize for Best Actor for his role in the film.

Cast
 Sergio Prina
 Liliana Juarez
 Leon Zelarayan
 Mirella Pascual

References

External links
 

2018 films
2018 drama films
Argentine drama films
2010s Spanish-language films
2010s Argentine films